Syncollesis is a genus of moths in the family Geometridae described by Prout in 1930. It includes at least nine species.

Species
Syncollesis ankalirano Viette, 1981
Syncollesis bellista (Bethune-Baker, 1913)
Syncollesis coerulea (Warren, 1896)
Syncollesis elegans (Prout, 1912)
Syncollesis idia Prout, 1930
Syncollesis pauliani Herbulot, 1954
Syncollesis seydeli Debauche, 1941
Syncollesis tiviae Prout, 1934
Syncollesis trilineata (Hampson, 1910)

References

Geometrinae